Svetlana Malahova-Shishkina (born 27 March 1977) is a Kazakhstani cross country skier who has competed since 1995. Her best World Cup finish was third in a 10 km event in China in 2007.

Malahova-Shishkina also competed in four Winter Olympics, earning her best finish of 10th in the 4 x 5 km relay at Vancouver in 2010. Her best individual finish was 10th in the 10 km event at Vancouver in 2010.

Malahova-Shishkina's best finish at the FIS Nordic World Ski Championships was fourth in the 4 x 5 km relay at Val di Fiemme in 2003 while her best individual finish was seventh in the 10 km event at Oberstdorf in 2005.

References

External links
 
 

1977 births
Living people
Kazakhstani female cross-country skiers
Olympic cross-country skiers of Kazakhstan
Cross-country skiers at the 1998 Winter Olympics
Cross-country skiers at the 2002 Winter Olympics
Cross-country skiers at the 2006 Winter Olympics
Cross-country skiers at the 2010 Winter Olympics
Asian Games medalists in cross-country skiing
Asian Games gold medalists for Kazakhstan
Asian Games silver medalists for Kazakhstan
Asian Games bronze medalists for Kazakhstan
Cross-country skiers at the 1996 Asian Winter Games
Cross-country skiers at the 1999 Asian Winter Games
Cross-country skiers at the 2003 Asian Winter Games
Cross-country skiers at the 2007 Asian Winter Games
Cross-country skiers at the 2011 Asian Winter Games
Medalists at the 1996 Asian Winter Games
Medalists at the 1999 Asian Winter Games
Medalists at the 2003 Asian Winter Games
Medalists at the 2007 Asian Winter Games
Medalists at the 2011 Asian Winter Games
20th-century Kazakhstani women
21st-century Kazakhstani women